Mansfield Creek is a tributary of the Little Tuya River, which in turn is a tributary of the Tuya River, part of the Stikine River watershed in northwest part of the province of British Columbia, Canada. Mansfield Creek's watershed's land cover is classified as 40.5% shrubland, 35.3% conifer forest, 17.6% mixed forest, and small amounts of other cover.

Mansfield Creek is in the traditional territory of the Tahltan First Nation, of the Tahltan people.

Geography
From its source near the large U-shaped valley through which Beatty Creek runs, Mansfield Creek flows generally south then east through wetlands, lakes, and barren lands atop Level Mountain's high lava plateau. From this high plateau Mansfield Creek enters a steep forested canyon carved into the escarpment on Level Mountain's southeastern edge, through which the creek flows east to empty into the Little Tuya River.

See also
List of British Columbia rivers

References 

Cassiar Land District
Level Mountain
Nahlin Plateau
Rivers of British Columbia
Stikine Country
Tahltan